Cheddar Reservoir is an artificial reservoir in Somerset, England, operated by Bristol Water. Dating from the 1930s it has a capacity of 1350 million gallons (6,140,000 cubic metres). The reservoir is supplied with water taken from the Cheddar Yeo river in Cheddar Gorge. The inlet grate for the  water pipe that is used to transport the water can be seen immediately upstream from the sensory garden in Cheddar Gorge. It lies to the west of the village of Cheddar and south east of the town of Axbridge. Because of this it is sometimes known as Axbridge Reservoir. It is roughly circular in shape, and surrounded by large earth banks which are grazed by sheep.

History
The reservoir was built by Sir Robert McAlpine and completed in 1937. It was the first British reservoir to permit sailing.

Description
The reservoir has been designated as a Site of Special Scientific Interest (Ref No:1003948) due to its wintering waterfowl populations. Two car parks give access to the reservoir; one is at the Axbridge end, and on the eastern side, accessible from Cheddar. Two water towers are present, one at the Cheddar end, and one at the Axbridge end. Bristol Corinthians sailing club is situated at its northern end. Other recreational activities at the reservoir include windsurfing, angling (for pike, tench, roach, perch and eels), and birdwatching.

Bird life

Wildfowl present regularly in winter include mallard (Anas platyrhynchos), gadwall (Anas strepera), tufted duck (Aythya fuligula), common pochard (Aythya ferina), Eurasian wigeon (Anas penelope), common goldeneye (Bucephala clangula) and goosander (Mergus merganser). A large flock of coot (Fulica atra) is present, and great crested grebe (Podiceps cristatus) is also numerous.

Because of its proximity to the Bristol Channel, storm-blown seabirds are occasionally found here, including shag, grey phalarope, and divers and grebes.

A moderately sized gull roost has attracted glaucous, Iceland and ring-billed gulls on multiple occasions.

A number of rare and scarce vagrant birds have been seen at Cheddar Reservoir, mainly waterfowl and shorebirds. Up to 2004 the following species had occurred:

Proposals for a second reservoir
Bristol Water has long identified Cheddar as the site for a new reservoir.
In 2007 it announced that the new reservoir would be one of the options considered in its Draft 2009 Water Resources Plan.
The new reservoir would hold 6,000 million litres, roughly the same size as the existing reservoir, which it would be based alongside.

In October 2012 survey work started on the new reservoir to the south of the existing one, with a planning application scheduled for December 2013.

In 2018 it was announced that the plans for the second reservoir had been scrapped.

References

External links

Bristol Corinthian Yacht Club
Cheddar Reservoir panorama (BBC)

Reservoirs in Somerset
Drinking water reservoirs in England
Sites of Special Scientific Interest in Somerset
Sites of Special Scientific Interest notified in 1972
Wetland Sites of Special Scientific Interest
Cheddar, Somerset